The  and  were Japanese limited express train services which operated between  and  via the undersea Seikan Tunnel from December 2002 until March 2016. The services were operated by East Japan Railway Company (JR East) and Hokkaido Railway Company (JR Hokkaido) respectively.

Hakuchō

The Hakuchō name actually dated back to 1960, as the name of a service which ran from Osaka to Aomori until March 2001. The name was reused for the new services starting in 2002 by popular demand.

Super Hakuchō

History

Semi express

Limited express
From 1965, the Ueno services were separated to become the Hakutaka, and the Hakuchō was rerouted via Niigata. 485 series electric multiple units were used from October 1972. From 1988, the rolling stock was refurbished and repainted in a new livery of cream with light blue and dark blue waistline stripes. Hakuchō services between Osaka and Aomori ran until 2 March 2001.

Kaikyo Line limited express

Withdrawal

The Hakucho and Super Hakucho services were discontinued in March 2016 ahead of the opening of the Hokkaido Shinkansen high-speed line. The last services operated on 21 March 2016.

See also
 List of named passenger trains of Japan

References

External links

 JR East 485 series Hakuchō 

East Japan Railway Company
Hokkaido Railway Company
Named passenger trains of Japan
Railway services introduced in 1960
Railway services discontinued in 2016
2016 disestablishments in Japan